Edward Jack Peter Westwick (born 27 June 1987) is an English actor and musician best known for his role as Chuck Bass on The CW's Gossip Girl as well as Vincent Swan in the TV series White Gold. He made his feature film debut in Children of Men (2006) and has since appeared in the films Breaking and Entering (2006), Son of Rambow (2007), S. Darko (2009), Chalet Girl (2011), J. Edgar (2011), Romeo & Juliet (2013), Bone in the Throat (2015), Freaks of Nature (2015), Billionaire Ransom (2016), and Me You Madness (2021).

Early life
Westwick was born in Hammersmith, London, and raised in Stevenage, Hertfordshire. He was born the youngest of 3 boys for Carole (née Blenkiron), an educational psychologist, and Peter Westwick, a university lecturer. He began music lessons and attended a Saturday morning drama school from the age of six. Westwick was educated at The Barclay School and North Hertfordshire College, where he took A-levels in business, law, and communication. He later trained at the National Youth Theatre in London.

Career

Acting
Westwick made his film debut in Breaking and Entering (2006), following an open audition casting call sent to the National Youth Theatre. He went on to guest star in the British television series Doctors as Holden, Casualty as Johnny Cullin, and Afterlife as Darren. He also had a minor role in the film Children of Men (2006).

In 2007, Westwick appeared in the film Son of Rambow and was cast as Chuck Bass in The CW's teen drama series Gossip Girl, based on the book series of the same name by Cecily von Ziegesar. Westwick said of his casting, "There wasn't much work in the UK. I was only in LA for a month and I got this show. It's changed my life." For his portrayal of Chuck, he assumed an American accent, based on the character Carlton Banks from The Fresh Prince of Bel-Air. As a result of the show's success, he was named one of 2008's Sexiest Men Alive by People magazine, and appeared the following year on its "100 Most Beautiful" list with the whole cast of Gossip Girl. Westwick earned the 2008 and 2009 awards for Best TV Villain at the Teen Choice Awards, and was named Breakthrough Talent by GQ in 2010. Entertainment Weekly also named Westwick's character Chuck Bass number one in their "Best Dressed TV Characters of 2008" list (tied with Leighton Meester's character Blair Waldorf), as well as in their "Best Performances" list alongside co-star Meester.

In 2008, Westwick became the new face of K-Swiss. That same year, he appeared as Joey in the horror film 100 Feet. In 2009, Westwick played the role of Randy Holt in the sequel to Donnie Darko, directed by Chris Fisher, and guest-starred in the third season of the Showtime original series Californication, as Chris "Balt" Smith, a student who was fascinated with vampire literature. In May 2009, he was attached to play Heathcliff in the film adaptation of Wuthering Heights. However, in January 2010, director Peter Webber left the project, which was then passed into the hands of Andrea Arnold. This directing change caused the roles to be recast.

In 2010, Westwick starred in the McHenry Brothers short film The Commuter, which was shot on a Nokia N8 smartphone. In January 2011, Westwick joined Clint Eastwood's film J. Edgar, a biopic about J. Edgar Hoover, the controversial first director of the FBI. That same year, he appeared in the romantic comedy Chalet Girl. He co-narrated the audio book version of City of Fallen Angels by Cassandra Clare and also narrated Clare's second novel Clockwork Prince from The Infernal Devices series. In mid-2011, Westwick became an international celebrity endorser for Penshoppe, a local clothing brand in the Philippines.

He next co-starred in the film adaptation of Romeo & Juliet as the main antagonist and Juliet's cousin, Tybalt. The film was released on 11 October 2013. Westwick then portrayed the lead role in the film adaptation of Anthony Bourdain's novel Bone in the Throat, which premiered at South by Southwest on 14 March 2015. Westwick then co-starred in the horror comedy film Freaks of Nature, which was released on 30 October 2015. In March 2015, he joined the cast of ABC's short-lived crime drama series Wicked City as Kent Grainger, a sadistic Sunset Strip serial killer. The series was cancelled after airing 3 episodes, but was picked up by Hulu to air the remaining 5 episodes. Westwick was next seen in Jim Gillespie's Billionaire Ransom, released on 19 August 2016, and stars in the thriller The Crash, released on 13 January 2017.

Westwick played Vincent Swan in the BBC Two television comedy series White Gold (2017). The show has so far aired two seasons for a total of 12 episodes.

Westwick starred in Me You Madness (2021), co-starring and directed by Louise Linton.

Music
Westwick was a member of the British band The Filthy Youth. The punk band, formed in 2006, was inspired by the Rolling Stones, The Doors and Kings of Leon. The songs "Come Flash All You Ladies" and "Orange" were both featured in an episode of Gossip Girl. The band consisted of fellow countrymen Benjamin Lewis Allingham (guitar), Jimmy Wright (guitar), Tom Bastiani (bass), and John Vooght (drummer).

Westwick is also the vocalist of the band For You, who released their first single “Tailspin” on the 15th of January 2023.

Personal life
Westwick shared an apartment with his Gossip Girl co-star Chace Crawford in the Chelsea neighbourhood of Manhattan from the beginning of the series in 2007 until July 2009, when Crawford moved out.

Westwick supports the football club Chelsea F.C.

Sexual misconduct allegations
In November 2017, allegations were separately made by three women: Kristina Cohen, Rachel Eck, and Aurélie Wynn. Cohen and Wynn made claims of rape, and Eck claims of sexual assault. All three claim the incidents occurred in 2014. Westwick issued a statement describing the allegations from Cohen and Wynn as "unverified and provably untrue" and further stated: "I have never forced myself in any manner, on any woman. I certainly have never committed rape". In July 2018, the office of the Los Angeles District Attorney announced that Westwick would not be prosecuted regarding the claims of rape and sexual assault. Prosecutors said witnesses identified by the first two alleged victims were "not able to provide information that would enable the prosecution to prove either incident beyond a reasonable doubt", with prosecutors unable to contact the third claimant. Prosecutors also noted additional claims made by other individuals would not be looked into due to being outside the statute of limitations.

The allegations resulted in the re-shooting of scenes involving Westwick in the BBC adaptation of Agatha Christie's Ordeal by Innocence with Christian Cooke, and in series two of White Gold being "paused". Westwick has stated he is disappointed with the actions of the BBC due to the ongoing investigations, legal processes, and the unverified nature of the claims.

Filmography

Film

Television

Music videos

Awards and nominations

References

External links

 
 PopGurls Interview: Ed Westwick

1987 births
Living people
Audiobook narrators
English expatriates in the United States
English male film actors
English male models
English male television actors
English rock singers
English male singer-songwriters
Male actors from Hertfordshire
Musicians from Hertfordshire
National Youth Theatre members
People from Chelsea, Manhattan
People from Hammersmith
People from Stevenage
21st-century English male actors
21st-century English singers
21st-century British male singers
|}